At the Village Gate could refer to several albums recorded at The Village Gate nightclub in New York City, including:

Herbie Mann at the Village Gate, 1961
Larry Coryell at the Village Gate, 1971
Milt Jackson Quintet Live at the Village Gate, 1963
Nina at the Village Gate by Nina Simone, 1962

See also:
Byrd at the Gate by Charlie Byrd, 1963
Herbie Mann Returns to the Village Gate, 1961
Havin' a Ball at the Village Gate by Lambert, Hendricks & Bavan, 1963
Swingin' at the Gate by Johnny Lytle, 1967
Toshiko at Top of the Gate by Toshiko Akiyoshi, 1963